The Talysh National Movement is a Talysh movement created in 2007 in the Netherlands, where part of the Talysh leadership lives in exile. Many of the movement's members had previously participated in the formation of the Talysh-Mughan Autonomous Republic in 1993, including board member Alikram Hummatov.

The Talysh National Movement joined the Unrepresented Nations and Peoples Organization on 26 June 2007. This was terminated on 1 March 2008 before it was re-admitted on 29 June 2014.

History 
In the second half of August 1993, the members of the Talysh-Mughan Autonomous Republic and servicemen associated with the President of the TMAR Alikram Hummatov were recalled from the front, then arrested and subjected to repression. Alikram Hummatov's relatives were also repressed, his brothers and uncle were arrested and convicted of harboring a state criminal. Alikram Hummatov's wife was hiding from arrest for a long time. Alikram Hummatov's twelve-year-old son was tortured by the police by burning his hands with cigarettes. Alikram Hummatov was arrested and sentenced to death, later commuted to life in prison. Under pressure from the Council of Europe, he was pardoned in 2004. From the Netherlands and other European countries, he and other refugees from Talysh try to support the still active national movement in Azerbaijan.

Since 2007, Alikram Hummatov has been heading the Talysh National Movement (TNM) in the Netherlands, where part of the Talysh leadership of the TMAR lives in exile. In particular, the TNM stands for the creation of a Talysh province with regional administration within the borders of Azerbaijan. The organization calls for the decentralization of power in order to promote more equitable representation of minority groups, as well as to guarantee cultural and linguistic freedoms.

The headquarters of the organization is considered to be The Hague, where the head of the Gummat movement lives; the organization is headed by a political council of 15 people.

On 5 May 2015, the Organization of Nations and Peoples without Representation (UNPO), together with the European Parliament and in cooperation with the Talysh National Movement (TNM), convened a conference entitled "Azerbaijan: Double Standards and Abuses of Minority Rights". The second part of the conference, entitled “Ways Forward: Civil Society Initiatives, Economic Development and International Strategies,” was aimed at discussing theoretical and practical alternatives for protecting the rights of minorities in Azerbaijan. The second part was opened by TNM President Alikram Hummatov, who addressed the problems arising from the extreme political centralization of the Aliyev government. While in theory it is a democracy, he said, there is no real separation of powers in the country, and its current political system leaves no room for dissent or alternative opinions. In his opinion, a possible solution lies in political reforms and decentralization, which will give each of the country's regions the opportunity to change their social, cultural and economic life in accordance with their needs and identity.

An important role in the movement is played by the former chairman of the People's Mejlis of the Talysh-Mughan Autonomous Republic, philosopher and political scientist Fahraddin Abbaszadeh, who emigrated to Russia in 1995, but returned to his homeland in 2005 and published a newspaper in Baku, but in 2008 was forced to emigrate to Russia because of harassment. In July 2018, F. Abbaszadeh was detained by the Russian authorities and at the beginning of 2019 extradited to Azerbaijan, where he was brought to trial for anti-state activities. When studying the materials on the basis of which the accusatory decision was made, the international human rights organization Amnesty International, in its report "Azerbaijan authorities must release Talysh activists", came to the conclusion that none of these materials contains evidence of any recognized crimes in accordance with international law and standards, or contains any incitement to acts of violence. Calls for secession are protected by international law, and Abbaszadeh exercised his right to freedom of expression in upholding his vision of an independent Talysh state.

Movement goals 
The Talysh National Movement stands for the Talysh region with regional joint administration within the borders of Azerbaijan. This requires decentralization of power in order to promote fairer representation of minority groups, as well as to guarantee cultural and linguistic freedoms. On 15 July 2018, a group of young activists, together with Alikram Hummatov, formed the government of the Talysh-Mughan Autonomous Republic in exile. The TNM government sends letters and statements to international organizations, states and world human rights organizations to reflect the position of the Talysh in the country. It also calls on the Azerbaijani government to end discrimination against Talysh people, demands that the Talysh language be taught in schools and that Talysh people can earn their living in their own country, and not be forced to leave abroad. All ministers of the government of the Talysh-Mughan Autonomous Republic live in exile, in countries such as the Netherlands.

Problems 

According to the UNPO website, like many other minorities in Azerbaijan, the inhabitants of Talysh are subjected to aggressive attempts at assimilation - the Talysh language has no formal education, and reading and speaking this language is not welcomed by the authorities. Instead, Talysh are encouraged to use Azeri or Persian in official situations. Thus, the number of young people studying in the Talysh language is decreasing, as this language is currently classified by UNESCO as "vulnerable". This poses a serious threat to the cultural integrity of the Talysh, and therefore one of the key goals of the TNM is greater linguistic freedom.

Active Talysh figures who claimed the rights of the Talysh people, who were conducting human rights work, or who had a point of view not conforming to the official authorities were persecuted, for example, the deaths in prison of the scientist Novruzali Mammadov and Fahraddin Abbaszadeh, the prison sentence of journalist Hilal Mammadov, the oppression of Atakhan Abilov and the arrest of Elvin Isaev.

The leaders of the Talysh national movement are convinced that the current authorities of Azerbaijan continue the course for the complete assimilation of the Talysh on the principle "no people - no problem".

See also
 History of Talysh
 Talish-i Gushtasbi

References 

Talysh
History of Talysh
Talysh people
The National Talysh Movement